The Shark Bay broad-blazed slider (Lerista varia) is a species of skink found in Western Australia. It was described by Storr in 1986.

References

Lerista
Reptiles described in 1986
Taxa named by Glen Milton Storr